Boss is a 2006 Indian Telugu-language romantic action film, produced by D. Siva Prasad Reddy on Kamakshi Movies banner and directed by V. N. Aditya. Starring Nagarjuna Akkineni, Nayanthara, Poonam Bajwa and Shriya Saran. Music was composed by Kalyani Malik and Harry Anand and Cinematography for the movie was handled by Siva Kumar while editing was handled by Marthand K. Venkatesh. The film was released on 27 September 2006. The film was dubbed into Malayalam with the same title and into Hindi as Yeh Kaisa Karz (2008). The film was commercially unsuccessful.

Plot
SRK is a real estate contractor. He uses muscle power to encroach land and make money. His rival Gopala Krishna "GK" is the 'Boss' of GK Constructions. GK has the power to handle goons as well as the real estate business. He calls for applications from MBA graduates as his personal secretary. None of the applicants meet his expectations. He accidentally meets Anuradha "Anu" and thinks that she is fit for the job. As a 'Boss', he is tough with his staff but also cares for them. During a trip to Malaysia, Anu and GK get closer, and Anu loses her heart to GK. When she is about to confess her love, Anu gets involved in a petty issue and faces the wrath of GK. Consequently, she requests to resign from her job, while she is on duty for her last one month, GK calls for interviews for his personal secretary again and zeroes in on Sruthi. It is revealed that she was planted in GK's office by SRK. In order to get her father Ramamurthy released from a false case, Sruthi steals a tender file. However, she does not hand it over to SRK and demands her father's release. The crooked SRK does not listen to her. At this juncture, she tries to escape from the scene and is saved by GK at the insistence of Anu. However, Anu is injured in the attack by goons in the process, but goes straight to the Tenders office and files the tender to save GK from a huge loss and to fulfill his ambition of securing his dream project. When GK is about to thank her, she admits her love for him, only to learn of his past. GK reveals that he loved Sanjana and married her. She died in a tsunami shortly after. GK refuses Anu's love politely even though he has some feeling for her too, but he can't replace Sanjana by Anu. He also tells her that Shruthi was hired to be Anu's assistant. Later, Sanjana's mother, Sumitra, dies of illness in Malaysia, and her husband Viswanath tells GK that her last wish is the marriage of GK with Anu. He gets a feeling that Sanjana wants the same. As some time passes, GK realizes his feelings for Anu. He returns to India. On the way, SRK men attack GK, and he gets stabbed with a knife. However, he stops Anu's marriage and unites with her.

Cast

 Nagarjuna Akkineni as Gopala Krishna / GK 
 Nayanthara as Anuradha / Anu
 Poonam Bajwa as Shruti
 Sayaji Shinde as SRK
 Nassar as Viswanath, Sanjana's father
 Brahmanandam as Abhay
 Sunil as Sunil
 Ali as Nagarjunasagar
 Dharmavarapu Subramanyam as Chari
 Chandra Mohan as Girls Orphanage warden
 Tanikella Bharani as Anuradha's father
 M. S. Narayana 
 Venu Madhav 
 Raghu Babu 
 Ananth Babu
 Kondavalasa 
 Raghunatha Reddy
 Malladi Raghava 
 Ashok Kumar
 Chitti
 Sumalatha as Sanjana's mother
 Hema 
 Rajitha
 Lahari 
 Devisri 
 Ooma 
 Ooma Chowdary 
 Revathi 
 Ravali 
 Keerthi 
 Dolly 
 Master Teja as Young GK  
 Baby Nishiptha as Young Anu  
 Saloni Aswani in item song Nachindhi Chesey
 Shriya Saran as Sanjana (Guest appearance)
 Nicolette Bird in item song Naa Kallu Vaale

Soundtrack

Music composed by Kalyan Koduri and Harry Anand. Music released on ADITYA Music Company.

Hindi Songs - Lyrics: Nawab Arzoo
 "Dil Kho Gaya, Haan"
 "Jaane Jaa Dil Mera"
 "Bin Tere Na Jeena"
 "Hello Yaara Dil Dara"
 "Chhaya Nasha Nasha"
 "Jee Le Joel Pyaar"
 "Chupke Se Chupke Se"

References

External links
 

2006 films
2000s Telugu-language films
Indian romantic action films
Films directed by V. N. Aditya
2000s romantic action films